The Turkey: An American Story is a non-fiction book by Andrew F. Smith.

Summary
The book reveals that turkeys can tell us about cultural issues and reveal something about being American. The book is about the history of turkeys and it has turkey recipes. The history of the bird has to do with such things as turkey bones found in 3700 BC and the domestication of turkeys into Europe by explorers of the New World. The recipes are from the 16th through the 19th century. The book also talks about the efforts to stop the wild turkey from becoming extinct.

Reception
The book was reviewed by Reference & Research Book News.
It was reviewed by The New England Quarterly.
A Publishers Weekly review says, "Short chapter sections keep the reading flowing, but the eye-glazing number of facts and dry prose can be overwhelming. Still, Smith has produced a well-researched, comprehensive, though somewhat scattered account of the bird most people take for granted".

References

2006 non-fiction books
American history books
Books about food and drink